The Mayor of the City of Dallas is the head of the Dallas City Council. The current mayor is Eric Johnson, who has served one term since 2019 and is the 62nd mayor to serve the position. Dallas operates under a weak-mayor system, and a board-appointed city manager operates as the chief executive of the city.

Duties and powers
The city of Dallas operates under a council-manager government type, putting the city of Dallas in a unique position as being one of the largest cities in the United States to utilize this municipal government structure. Unlike the more common form of government used by large cities known as the mayor-council government - where the mayor serves the chief-executive position of the city - the council-manager government of the city of Dallas gives the chief-executive position to the appointed City Manager. As a result, the mayor is elected at-large and serves a largely ceremonial position fulfilling a handful of key duties. The mayor serves as a member of the city council, presides over city council meetings and official ceremonies, and serves as a representative to the City of Dallas at a local, state, national, and international level. Likewise, it is not uncommon for mayors of the city of Dallas to simultaneously serve as members or heads of other committees while in office, further representing the interests of the people and city of Dallas in organizations and committees.

History
The Office of Mayor was created with the formation of the Dallas City Charter in 1856, also providing for the mayor six aldermen, a treasurer, recorder and a constable. In the charter, it was stated that each office would be elected for a term of one year. In the reorganization of 1876, the mayor was elected to the office for a term of two years. The office was first filled in the election of 1856, in which Dr. Samuel B. Pryor defeated A. D. Rice for the position. A. D. Rice would run for office again and go on to serve as the 4th mayor of the city.

For much of the 19th century, mayors of the city of Dallas served for only one term. This precedence was broken at the end of Winship C. Connor's term, who – after serving three consecutive terms from 1887 to 1894 – was the longest-serving mayor of the city at the time. His success was accredited to the development of the city's first water, power, and streetcar systems.

The municipal government of Dallas underwent two significant structural changes during its history. The first change was made in 1907 where the city voted to change from an alderman system to a commission form of government. Stephen J. Hay was the first mayor elected in this new form of government, demonstrating the success of the highly debated commission form of government and contributing to the development of White Rock Lake in response to a water shortage in 1910. The second major government change was made in 1930, altering the commission form of government to specifically be a council-manager form. The first mayor to serve following this change was Tom Bradford, a successful grocer who was a significant financial contributor to the Bradford Memorial Hospital for Babies, the preliminary institution to the Children's Medical Center Dallas. He died after suffering a major heart attack in 1932 and was the first mayor of Dallas to die in office.

Woodall Rodgers was mayor of Dallas from 1939 to 1947, one of the few mayors in the city's history to serve a full eight year tenure. He was mayor during World War II and served during the rampant manufacturing of aircraft and weapon goods in a rapidly industrializing Dallas, along with the neighboring city of Fort Worth. At the time, Dallas Love Field was used as a joint USAAF base and training ground. Following the end of the war, significant improvements were made to the airport to modernize facilities and prepare it for the Jet Age. He was also mayor when the Mercantile National Bank Building was constructed, which was the only skyscraper built in the United States during World War II and was the tallest building in the city of Dallas until the completion of Republic Center Tower I in 1954. The economic success brought by his contributions in office are commemorated by several namesakes throughout the city, most notably the Woodall Rodgers Freeway that passes underneath Klyde Warren Park and over the Trinity River along the Margaret Hunt Hill Bridge.

Earle Cabell served as 48th mayor from 1961 to 1964 and was mayor during the assassination of President John F. Kennedy in the city. In the wake of the assassination, Cabell was the target of multiple death threats and accusations of his involvement in the act.

The image of the city of Dallas was immensely tarnished by the assassination of the President, earning the moniker "City of Hate". Following Earle Cabell was Mayor J. Erik Jonsson who funded and supported the then proposed Dallas/Fort Worth International Airport. As mayor, he went on to support public works projects such as developing the new Dallas City Hall, the Dallas Convention Center, and the Dallas Central Library the last of which is now named in his honor. He was followed by Wes Wise who went on to further improve the city's image during his term from 1971 to 1973. However, he stepped down to pursue a political career in United States Congress before the end of his term. His pro-term mayoral successor, Adlene Harrison, stepped in and became acting mayor for the remainder of his term. She was the city's first female mayor, and the first female Jewish mayor in the United States. Although Dianne Feinstein is officially recognized as the first female Jewish mayor in the United States, Adlene Harrison's position as acting mayor predates Feinstein's start in office by almost two years; Adlene began serving as acting mayor on February 11, 1976, while Feinstein took office on December 4, 1978. Adlene would go on to serve as a member of several environmental committees and organizations after her short tenure, including the Environmental Protection Agency.

Ron Kirk was the first African-American mayor of the City of Dallas and served two terms from 1995 to 2002. As mayor, he led several efforts advocating for race equality and social welfare, mitigated tension between City Council and the controversial Dallas School Board, advocated for economic development, and oversaw the construction of the American Airlines Center. He would later step down to pursue a seat in the US Senate, where he lost in the 2002 election to John Cornyn. After his defeat, he went on to become a lobbyist before being nominated and appointed by President Barack Obama to serve as United States Trade Representative from 2009 to 2013.

Laura Miller - the city's third female mayor, following Adlene Harrison and Annette Strauss - was instrumental in renegotiating the Wright Amendment to revise flight restrictions at Love Field Airport, as well as implementing a citywide smoking ban and an ordinance prohibiting sex-based discrimination. The following mayor Tom Leppert would impose a staunch crime-fighting policy, promote the economic development of a modern inland port, and was a vocal supporter of a controversial convention center hotel project at the peak of the 2008 recession. He would later vacate the office to pursue a US Senate campaign in 2012, of which he would place third in the runoff. Following the four-month incumbency of acting mayor Dwaine Caraway, mayor Mike Rawlings would be known for his vocal leadership during the 2014 Ebola outbreak, the 2016 shooting of Dallas police officers, and the removal of confederate monuments following the Charlottesville riots.

List

This is the list of people who have held the office of Mayor. Note: municipal elections in Texas are non-partisan. The party affiliation of the Mayor is listed here for informational purposes only.

See also
History of Dallas

Notes

References

External links
Official page

Dallas

Mayors